Neupetershain is a municipality in the Oberspreewald-Lausitz district, in Lower Lusatia, Brandenburg, Germany.

History 
From 1815 to 1947, Neupetershain was part of the Prussian Province of Brandenburg. From 1952 to 1990, it was part of the Bezirk Cottbus of East Germany.

Demography

References

Populated places in Oberspreewald-Lausitz